A French leave, sometimes Irish goodbye or Irish exit, is a departure  from a location or event without informing others or without seeking approval. Examples include relatively innocuous acts such as leaving a party without bidding farewell in order to avoid disturbing or upsetting the host, or more problematic acts such as a soldier leaving his post without authorization.

The phrase is first recorded in 1771 and was born at a time when the English and French cultures were heavily interlinked.

In French, the equivalent phrase is filer à l'anglaise ("to leave English style") and seems to date from the turn of the 19th and 20th centuries.

First usage
The Oxford English Dictionary records: "the custom (in the 18th century prevalent in France and sometimes imitated in England) of going away from a reception, etc. without taking leave of the host or hostess. Hence, jocularly, to take French leave is to go away, or do anything, without permission or notice." OED states the first recorded usage as: 1771 SMOLLETT Humph. Cl. (1895) 238 "He stole away an Irishman's bride, and took a French leave of me and his master".

James Boswell's journal for November 15, 1762 mentions his friend not seeing him off on his leaving Scotland "... as Cairnie told me that people never took leave in France, I made the thing sit pretty easy."

In Canada and the United States, the expression Irish goodbye is also used.

Military usage
The term is especially used to mean the act of leisurely absence from a military unit. This comes from the rich history of Franco-English conflict; as Spain has a similar saying concerning the French (despedida a la francesa), it may have come from the Napoleonic campaign in the Iberian Peninsula which pitted the French against an Anglo-Portuguese and Spanish alliance.

In other languages
 Czech:  ("to leave English style")
 Dutch:  ("to take the rat's taxi")
 French:  ("to leave English style")
 Greek:  ("to leave (with approval) by the Flag")
 Hungarian:  ("to leave English style")
 Italian:  ("to leave English style")
 Polish:  ("to leave English style")
 Portuguese:  ("to leave French style")
 Romanian:  ("to leave English style")
 Russian: уйти по-английски ("to leave English style")
 Spanish:   ("goodbye in the French way", "French farewell")
 Ukrainian: піти по-англійськи ("to leave English style")
 Walloon:  ("to leave English style")

References 

7. Proust, “Time Regained,” pg. 205 translation by Stephen Hudson, “As taking French leave, she passed me, I bowed and she, taking my hand, fixed her round violet orbs upon me...”
France–United Kingdom relations
Military life
Leave of absence
English culture
French culture